Parvarrish – Season 2 (English: Upbringing - Season 2, abbreviated as Parvarrish or Parvarish) is an Indian soap opera that premiered on 23 November 2015 on Sony Entertainment Television India. The show is a sequel to the 2011–2013 series Parvarrish – Kuchh Khattee Kuchh Meethi (English: Upbringing – Sweet and Sour) by the same producers, creative director and writing team and aired till 7 July 2016.

Parvarrish – Season 2 revolves around the families of two female friends who reconnect as mothers of teenagers. It focuses on the troubles of raising teenage children and the lessons they learn from the experience.

The ratings for the first season encouraged the show's renewal for a second season.

Plot 
Surinder Khurana and her husband Kulwinder move their middle-class family to Delhi to provide a better life for their children, Jassi and Jogi. In Delhi, Surinder meets her old friend, Simran Gupta, and they revive their friendship and discuss issues including parenting. Simran is an affluent working woman with a teenaged daughter, Riya.

In a Student of the Year competition, Jassi, Jogi and Riya represent their school along with rivals Aditya and Ankita. These latter two make several attempts to have the others withdrawn from the competition, with Aditya exploiting Riya's crush on him. Jogi saves Riya before things go too far

At the culmination of the competition, there is an attempt to assassinate the visiting minister of culture. Someone has also been spying on the Gupta family. Riya is kidnapped in an attempt to force her father to poison the minister, but they instead fake the minister's death to expose the culprit.

Later, Jassi, Jogi, Riya and Aditya – who has redeemed himself to the others – are driving from a party when they hit something with their car. They conceal this from their parents, and are surprised to learn a reported hit-and-run victim was the bully who chased them from the party. They soon find themselves caught in a blackmail scheme. When they ultimately confess what happened to authorities, it turns out that the hit-and-run driver was the son of the Deputy Commissioner of Police, who agrees to face the consequences of what he had done.

Cast

Khuranas
 Sangeeta Ghosh as Surinder "Suri" Khurana – Simran's best friend; Kulwinder's wife; Jogi and Jassi's mother
 Sandeep Baswana as Kulwinder Khurana – Daarji and Bebe's son; Suri's husband; Jogi and Jassi's father
 Anuj Pandit Sharma as Joginder "Jogi" Khurana – Suri and Kulwinder's son; Jassi's brother
 Diana Khan as Jaswinder "Jassi" Khurana – Suri and Kulwinder's daughter; Jogi's sister
 Deepak Qazir Kejriwal as Daarji – Kulwinder's father; Jogi and Jassi's grandfather
 Meenakshi Sethi as Bebe – Kulwinder's mother; Jogi and Jassi's grandmother

Guptas
 Gautami Kapoor as Simran Gupta – Suri's best friend; Raj's wife; Riya's mother
 Vinay Jain as Dr. Raj Gupta – Simran's husband; Riya's father
 Bhavika Sharma as Riya Gupta – Simran and Raj's daughter
 Seema Sharma as Mrs. Gupta – Raj's mother; Riya's grandmother

Recurring
Jitendra Nokewal as Aditya Kapoor – Riya's ex-boyfriend
Jovita Jose as Ankita Mehra – Jassi's rival
Sushant Mohindru as Rahul – Jassi's friend
 Aamir Dalvi as Sumedh Singh – Coach of SOTY
Bhoomika Sharma as Dolly – Riya's best friend
Simran Budharup as Meenu – Ankita's best friend

References

External links
 SonyLIV Site

Sony Entertainment Television original programming
2015 Indian television series debuts
Indian drama television series
Indian television soap operas